Valerie Saurette (born July 23, 1975) is a Canadian former pair skater. She is best known for her partnership with Jean-Sébastien Fecteau from 1995 to 2002. The pair competed on the Grand Prix series for three seasons, twice at the Four Continents (best result was fourth), and once at the World Championships, placing 13th. They won the silver medal at the 2001 Nebelhorn Trophy and three bronze medals at the Canadian Championships.

Programs 
(with Fecteau)

Competitive highlights
(with Fecteau)

References

External links

 

1975 births
Canadian female pair skaters
Living people
People from Granby, Quebec